R. K. Khanna Tennis Complex is a tennis stadium in New Delhi, India. It has a centre court, six match courts and six warm-up courts. It has a capacity of 5,015.

About 
The stadium was opened in 1982, and was renovated in 2009.

The arena was named after Raj Kumar Khanna, a former president of the All India Tennis Association (AITA) and a former non-playing captain of the India Davis Cup team.

It was a venue for the tennis events at the 1982 Asian Games and 2010 Commonwealth Games. It is also used sometimes for India's Fed Cup and Davis Cup matches.

From 2012 it will annually host the India Open, a WTA Challenger Tournament.

References

2010 Commonwealth Games venues
1982 Asian Games
Tennis venues in India
Sport in New Delhi
1982 establishments in Delhi
Sports venues completed in 1982
Sports venues in Delhi
20th-century architecture in India